is a Japanese voice actress, narrator and singer from Saitama Prefecture who is affiliated with Vi-Vo. She made her voice acting debut in 1982 with Tokimeki Tonight. Fukami is best known for her role in the Sailor Moon series as Sailor Venus. She had major roles in Final Fantasy XII (as Fran), Ashita no Nadja (as Carmen la Bailaora), Ninja Senshi Tobikage (as Schaffe) and New Cutey Honey (as Daiko Hayami). In addition to anime shows, she provides the Japanese dub localization for numerous international film and television actors including Catherine Zeta-Jones, Angelina Jolie, Sharon Stone and Jodie Foster.

Filmography

Television animation
1980s
Tokimeki Tonight (1982) (Michael)
Creamy Mami, the Magic Angel (1983) (Prince of Tongari Kingdom, others)
Igano Kabamaru (1983) (Receptionist, Schoolgirl A, Schoolgirl B, Schoolgirl C, Peasant, Valet)
Dr. Slump: Arale-chan - The Penguin Village Fire Brigade (1984) (Butako-chan)
Persia, the Magic Fairy (1984) (Touta Fuyuki)
Dirty Pair (1985) (Secretary)
Lupin III Part III (1985) (Mark)
Ninja Senshi Tobikage (1985) (Schaffe)
Touch (1985) (Kazuya Uesugi (young), Schoolgirl B, Schoolgirl A, Nitta's Mother)
Anmitsu Hime (1986) (ET's Wife)
High School! Kimengumi (1986) (Yasuka Kashikiri)
Robotan (1986) (Umi Takematsu)
City Hunter (1987) (Stewardess, Makoto, Miho, Girls, Schoolgirl, Female Customer)
City Hunter 2 (1988) (Jiro, Lady D, Girl, Beauty A)
F (1988) 
Transformers: Super-God Masterforce (1988) (Stewardess)
 1990s
High School Mystery: Gakuen Nanafushigi (1991) (Ayako Ōizumi, Kawasaki-sensei)
Genki Bakuhatsu Ganbaruger (1992) (Yayoi Kirigakure, Katsura Takeda)
Magical Princess Minky Momo (1992) (Ruby)
Pretty Soldier Sailor Moon (1992) (Minako Aino/Sailor Venus, Reika Nishimura/Rikoukeidar)
Anpanman (1993) (Stone Man)
Jungle King Tar-chan (1993) (Renhō)
Mobile Suit Victory Gundam (1993) (Helen Jackson)
Nekketsu Saikyō Go-Saurer (1993) (Yoji Hiyama's Mother)
Pretty Soldier Sailor Moon R (1993) (Minako Aino/Sailor Venus)
Yaiba (1993) (Kaguya)
Pretty Soldier Sailor Moon S (1994) (Minako Aino/Sailor Venus)
Macross Plus (1994) (Myung Fang Lone)
Pretty Soldier Sailor Moon SuperS (1995) (Minako Aino/Sailor Venus, Reika Nishimura)
Wedding Peach (1995) (Aquelda)
Detective Conan (1996) (Mika Taniguchi)
Pretty Soldier Sailor Moon Sailor Stars (1996) (Minako Aino/Sailor Venus)
Cutey Honey Flash (1997) (Daiko Hayami)
Crest of the Stars (1999) (Spoor)
Ojamajo Doremi (1999) (Majopurima)
 2000s
Banner of the Stars (2000) (Spall)
Digimon Frontier (2002) (Ophanimon)
Futari wa Pretty Cure (2004) (Regine)
Digimon Data Squad (2006) (Yggdrasil)
Gin Tama (2006) (Space Woman)
Government Crime Investigation Agent Zaizen Jotaro (2006) (Junko Yoshioka)
Jyu-Oh-Sei (2006) (Chan)
Katekyo Hitman Reborn! (2006) (Nana Sawada)
Michiko to Hatchin (2008) (Akasha)
 2010s
Mawaru Penguindrum (2011) (Eriko Oginome)
Btooom! (2012) (Shiki Murasaki)
Lupin the Third: The Woman Called Fujiko Mine (2012) (True Ailan)
God Eater (TV series) (2014) (Aisha Gauche)
Dimension W (2016) (Claire Skyheart)
Banana Fish (2018) (Jessica)
 2020s
Fena: Pirate Princess (2021) (Grace O'Malley)
Lupin the 3rd Part 6 (2021) (Tomoe)
Vampire in the Garden (2022) (Nobara)

ONA
Lupin the 3rd vs. Cat's Eye (2023) (Rui Kisugi)

OVA
Prefectural Earth Defense Force (1986) (Akiko Ifukube)
Ambassador Magma (1993) (Tomoko Murakami)
New Cutie Honey (1994) (Daiko Hayami)
JoJo's Bizarre Adventure (2000) (Enya the Hag)

Animated films
Sailor Moon R: The Movie (1993) (Minako Aino/Sailor Venus)
Sailor Moon S: The Movie (1994) (Minako Aino/Sailor Venus)
Sailor Moon SuperS: The Movie (1995) (Minako Aino/Sailor Venus)
Case Closed: Captured in Her Eyes (2000) (Tamaki Jinno)
Appleseed Ex Machina (2007) (Hajime Yoshino)

Video games
 Armored Core: Last Raven – Sheila Caldwell
 Assassin's Creed III – Gaji-Jio (Japanese dub)
 Bishojo Senshi Sailor Moon – Minako Aino/Sailor Venus
 Bishojo Senshi Sailor Moon R – Minako Aino/Sailor Venus
 Bishojo Senshi Sailor Moon S – Minako Aino/Sailor Venus
 Bishojo Senshi Sailor Moon: Another Story – Minako Aino/Sailor Venus
 Boys Over Flowers - Koiseyo Girls – Kaede Domyouji
 Castlevania: Symphony of the Night – Lisa, Succubus
 Dead Island – Puruna Jackson (Japanese dub)
 Final Fantasy XII – Fran
 Harry Potter – Hermione Granger (Japanese dub)
 Hitman: Absolution –  Diana Byrne Wood (Japanese dub)
 Macross Ace Frontier – Myung Fang Lone
 Mikagura Girl Detective Team – Ranmaru <Randolph Maruyama>, Moriyama Miwa

 Resident Evil: Revelations 2 (Alex Wesker)
 Resident Evil 3 (Alex Wesker)
 Super Robot Wars series
 Tactics Ogre: Reborn – Ravness Loxaerion
 Tengai Makyō: Daiyon no Mokushiroku – Jenny Mead

Dubbing

Film
Catherine Zeta-Jones
The Phantom  (Sala)
Entrapment (Virginia "Gin" Baker)
Chicago (Velma Kelly)
The Terminal (Amelia Warren)
Death Defying Acts (Mary McGarvie)
No Reservations (Kate Armstrong)
The Rebound (Sandy)
Broken City (Cathleen Hostetler)
Red 2 (Katya Petrokovich)
Side Effects (Dr. Victoria Siebert)
Angelina Jolie
Playing by Heart (Joan)
Gone in 60 Seconds (Sara "Sway" Wayland)
Original Sin  (Julia Russell/Bonny Castle)
Lara Croft: Tomb Raider  (Lara Croft)
Lara Croft Tomb Raider: The Cradle of Life  (Lara Croft)
Mr. & Mrs. Smith (2010 TV Asahi edition) (Jane Smith)
Beowulf (Grendel's Mother)
Maleficent (Maleficent)
Maleficent: Mistress of Evil (Maleficent)
Eternals (Thena)
Sharon Stone
Sliver  (Carly Norris)
Gloria (Gloria)
The Muse (Sarah Little)
Simpatico (Rosie Carter)
If These Walls Could Talk 2 (Fran)
Searching for Debra Winger (Sharon Stone)
Catwoman  (Laurel Hedare)
Border Run (Sofie)
Julia Roberts
Pretty Woman  (Vivian Ward)
Notting Hill  (Anna Scott)
Mona Lisa Smile  (Katherine Ann Watson)
Mirror Mirror (Queen Clementianna)
Money Monster (Patty Fenn)
Wonder (Isabel Minel Pullman)
Sandra Bullock
The Thing Called Love (Linda Lue Linden)
Miss Congeniality 2: Armed and Fabulous (Gracie Hart)
All About Steve (Mary Horowitz)
Gravity (Dr. Ryan Stone)
Our Brand Is Crisis ('Calamity' Jane Bodine)
Halle Berry
Boomerang – Angela Lewis
Executive Decision  – Jean
X-Men  – Ororo Munroe / Storm
X2  – Ororo Munroe / Storm
X-Men: The Last Stand  – Ororo Munroe / StormFamke JanssenHide and Seek  (Dr. Katherine Carson)
Taken (Lenore Mills)
Taken 2 (Lenore Mills)
Taken 3 (Lenore Mills)Jodie FosterThe Accused  (Sarah Tobias)
Maverick (Annabelle Bransford)
Panic Room (Meg Altman)
Carnage (Penelope Longstreet)Julianne Moore'Far from Heaven (Cathy Whitaker)Children of Men (Julian Taylor)Chloe (Dr. Catherine Stewart)Seventh Son (Mother Malkin)
 Anna Magdalena – Assistant Editor (Anita Yuen)
 Any Given Sunday – Christina Pagniacci (Cameron Diaz)
 Ashfall – Jeon Yoo-kyung – (Jeon Hye-jin)
 The Bank Job – Martine Love (Saffron Burrows)
 Basquiat – Gina Cardinale (Claire Forlani)
 Batman Forever  – Dr. Chase Meridian (Nicole Kidman)
 Black Rain – Joyce (Kate Capshaw)
 Blade Runner 2049 – Lt. Joshi (Robin Wright)
 Collateral Damage – Selena Perrini (Francesca Neri)
 Color of Night – Rose/Richie/Bonnie (Jane March)
 Coming 2 America – Queen Lisa Joffer (Shari Headley)
 Confessions of a Shopaholic – Jane Bloomwood (Joan Cusack)
 Courage Under Fire  – Captain Karen Emma Walden (Meg Ryan)
 Coyote Ugly – Lil Lovell (Maria Bello)
 The Crow (1997 TV Tokyo edition) – Sarah Mohr (Rochelle Davis)
 Dark Shadows – Angelique Bouchard Collins (Eva Green)
 Date Night – Claire Foster (Tina Fey)
 Deep Blue Sea – Dr. Susan McAlester (Saffron Burrows)
 Desperate Measures – Dr. Samantha Hawkins (Marcia Gay Harden)
 Disturbia – Julie Brecht (Carrie-Anne Moss)
 DOA: Dead or Alive – Christie (Holly Valance)
 Double Jeopardy – Elizabeth "Libby" Parsons (Ashley Judd)
 Down with Love – Vikki Hiller (Sarah Paulson)
 Dragon: The Bruce Lee Story – Linda Lee (Lauren Holly)
 Ed (Lydia (Jayne Brook))
 The Fabulous Baker Boys – Susie Diamond (Michelle Pfeiffer)
 Fantastic Beasts and Where to Find Them – Seraphina Picquery (Carmen Ejogo)
 Fear and Loathing in Las Vegas  – The Waitress at North Star Cafe (Ellen Barkin))
 The Firm – Abby McDeere (Jeanne Tripplehorn)
 Four Rooms – Elspeth (Madonna)
 Friday the 13th Part VIII: Jason Takes Manhattan – Rennie Wickham (Jensen Daggett)
 G.I. Jane – Lieutenant Jordan O'Neil (Demi Moore)
 Halifax: Retribution – Jane Halifax (Rebecca Gibney)
 Hanna – Marissa Wiegler (Cate Blanchett)
 Heart and Souls – Penny Washington (Alfre Woodard)
 Heat (1998 TV Asahi edition) – Charlene Shiherlis (Ashley Judd)
 House of Cards – Claire Underwood (Robin Wright)
 Inferno – Elizabeth Sinskey (Sidse Babett Knudsen)
 The Interpreter – Dot Woods (Catherine Keener)
 The Jacket – Dr. Beth Lorenson (Jennifer Jason Leigh)
 Jet Lag – Rose (Juliette Binoche)
 Last Christmas – Huang Qing Shin / 'Santa' (Michelle Yeoh)
 A League of Their Own – "All the Way" Mae Mordabito (Madonna)
 The Lover – The Young Girl (Jane March)
 Marley & Me – Jenny Grogan (Jennifer Aniston)
 Martin (2018 Blu-ray edition) – Abbie Santini (Elyane Nadeau)
 The Matrix Reloaded  – Niobe (Jada Pinkett Smith)
 The Matrix Revolutions  – Niobe (Jada Pinkett Smith)
 Mean Girls – Ms. Sharon Norbury (Tina Fey)
 Mindhunters – Sara Moore (Kathryn Morris)
 The Missing – Magdalena "Maggie" Gilkeson (Cate Blanchett)
 Mothers and Daughters– Beth (Courteney Cox)
 Mr. Brooks – Detective Tracy Atwood (Demi Moore)
 Nightcrawler – Nina Romina (Rene Russo)
 Notorious – Faith Evans (Antonique Smith)
 Office Christmas Party – Carol Vanstone (Jennifer Aniston)
 Out of Sight  – Karen Sisco (Jennifer Lopez)
 Pecker – Tina (Martha Plimpton)
 The Perfect Storm – Christina "Chris" Cotter (Diane Lane)
 The Pianist – Janina Bogucki (Ruth Platt)
 Prometheus – Meredith Vickers (Charlize Theron)
 Punch-Drunk Love – Lena Leonard (Emily Watson)
 Rampage – Claire Wyden (Malin Åkerman)Sabotage (Investigator Caroline Brentwood (Olivia Williams))
 The Santa Clause 3: The Escape Clause – Mrs. Claus/Carol Calvin (Elizabeth Mitchell)
 Single White Female – Allison "Allie" Jones (Bridget Fonda)
 Six Days, Seven Nights – Robin Monroe (Anne Heche)
 Someone Like You – Jane Goodale (Ashley Judd)
 A Sound of Thunder – Sonia Rand (Catherine McCormack)
 Spy Game – Elizabeth Hadley (Catherine McCormack)
 Stardust – Lamia (Michelle Pfeiffer)
 Sucker Punch – Dr. Vera Gorski / Madame Vera Gorski (Carla Gugino)
 The Ten Commandments (2002 TV Asahi edition) Nefretiri (Anne Baxter)
 This Means War – Trish (Chelsea Handler)
 Triple 9 – Irina Vlaslov (Kate Winslet)
 Turbulence – Teri Halloran (Lauren Holly)
 Unlocked – Emily Knowles (Toni Collette)
 Unthinkable – Agent Helen Brody (Carrie-Anne Moss)
 Up in the Air – Alexandra 'Alex' Goran (Vera Farmiga)
 The Vanishing – Rita Baker (Nancy Travis)
 Village of the Damned (1998 TV Asahi edition) – Barbara (Karen Kahn)
 Waterworld – Helen (Jeanne Tripplehorn)
 The Way, Way Back – Pam (Toni Collette)
 Wayne's World – Cassandra Wong (Tia Carrere)
 Wayne's World 2 – Cassandra Wong (Tia Carrere)
 What Women Want – Darcy McGuire (Helen Hunt)
 Wild Wild West (2002 NTV edition) – Miss Mae Lee East (Bai Ling)
 Wonder Woman – Antiope (Robin Wright)
 Wonder Woman 1984 – Antiope (Robin Wright)
 XXX: State of the Union – Lola Jackson (Nona Gaye)
 The Yellow Handkerchief – May (Maria Bello)
 Yesterday – Debra Hammer (Kate McKinnon)
 Zhong Kui: Snow Girl and the Dark Crystal – Snow Girl (Li Bingbing)

Television
 Battlestar Galactica (2006 series, season 4) – Helena Cain (Michelle Forbes)
 Beyond the Break – Elizabeth
 Burn Notice – Detective Paxson (Moon Bloodgood)
 Californication – Karen (Natascha McElhone)
 Chase – Annie Frost (Kelli Giddish)
 Criminal Minds – Emily Prentiss (Paget Brewster)
 CSI: New York (season 4) – Rene
 Dirt – Lucy Spiller (Courteney Cox)
 Eureka – Allison Blake (Salli Richardson)
 Friends – Monica Geller (Courteney Cox)
 Lost – Daniel
 The Mentalist (season 4) – Santori (Heather Mazur)
 No Limit – Alexandra (Hélène Seuzaret)
 Once Upon a Time – Regina (Lana Parrilla)
 One Tree Hill – Sheryl Crow
 ReGenesis – Jill Langston (Sarah Strange)
 Road to Avonlea – Olivia Dale (Mag Ruffman)
 Satisfaction – Mel
 Supernatural (season 2) – Molly (Tricia Helfer)
 The Unit (season 3) – Heather (Kim Thomson)
 Ultraman: The Ultimate Hero – Garners, Silvia Jackson

Animation

 Chicken Little (Foxy Loxy)
 How to Train Your Dragon 2 (Valka)
 How to Train Your Dragon: The Hidden World (Valka)
 Guillermo del Toro's Pinocchio (Wood Sprite/Death)
 PB&J Otter (Opal)
 Raya and the Last Dragon (Virana)
 The Simpsons'' (Kim Basinger)

Awards

References

External links
  
 
 

1963 births
Living people
Japanese contraltos
Japanese video game actresses
Japanese voice actresses
Voice actresses from Saitama Prefecture
20th-century Japanese actresses
21st-century Japanese actresses